Wulingyuan District is one of two urban districts in Zhangjiajie City, Hunan Province, China, it is also the smallest district by population in Hunan. Located on the central area of Zhangjiajie, the district is surrounded by Cili County to the northeast and southeast, to the north by Sangzhi County, to the south and southwest by Yongding District. The district is named after Wulingyuan of the UNESCO World Heritage Site, one of famous scenic zones.

It is divided into 2 subdistricts and 2 towns (November 27, 2015), its government seat is Jundiping Subdistrict.

Administrative divisions
After an adjustment of township-level administrative divisions of Wulingyuan District on 27 November 2015, Wulingyuan District has 2 subdistricts and 2 townships under its jurisdiction. Its government seat is Jundiping. they are:

2 Subdistricts
 Luoguta
 Jundiping

2 Towns
 Xiehe
 Zhonghu, Zhangjiajie

References

External links

County-level divisions of Hunan
Zhangjiajie